Barkley Dam is a dam along the Cumberland River in Kentucky. Its construction along with Kentucky Dam formed the Land Between the Lakes National Recreation Area (LBLNRA) by stopping the flow of the Cumberland and Tennessee Rivers, forming Lake Barkley and Kentucky Lake respectively.

Completed in 1966, the dam and artificial lake were both named for U.S. Vice President Alben Barkley.

References

External links

 Barkley Dam and Lake Barkley, US Army Corps of Engineers
 Barkley Dam Reservoir Information, Tennessee Valley Authority 
 Barkley Lock & Dam Info, on KentuckyLake.com

Dams in Kentucky
Buildings and structures in Livingston County, Kentucky
Buildings and structures in Lyon County, Kentucky
Hydroelectric power plants in Kentucky
United States Army Corps of Engineers dams
Energy infrastructure completed in 1966
Dams completed in 1966
Dams on the Cumberland River